Soyuz TM-15 was the 15th expedition to the Mir space station. It included spationaut Michel Tognini from France. The Soyuz TM-15 flight set what was then a new Soyuz spacecraft on orbit endurance record.

Crew

Mission highlights

Michel Tognini, passenger aboard Soyuz- TM 15, was the third Frenchman to visit a space station. He conducted ten experiments using 300 kg of equipment delivered by Progress-M flights. Tognini spent 2 weeks in space as part of ongoing space cooperation between Russia and France.

References

Crewed Soyuz missions
Spacecraft launched in 1992